Ardo Hillar Hansson (born 15 July 1958 in Chicago) is an Estonian American economist. He was the Governor of Bank of Estonia from 2012 to 2019.

Education
Hansson attended Semiahmoo Secondary School for high school. He later worked for several renowned universities and published numerous articles on economic policy. Hansson holds a PhD in economics from Harvard University.

Career
Hansson worked as an economist in the World Bank from 1998 to 2012 with Eastern European and Balkan countries and China. From 1993 to 1998, Hansson belonged to the Supervisory Board of the Bank of Estonia, from 1992 to 1995 and in 1997 he was economic adviser to the Prime Minister, and from 1991 to 1992 adviser to the Ministry of Foreign Affairs. He was also a member of the Monetary Reform Committee.

Other activities
 International Monetary Fund (IMF), Ex-Officio Member of the Board of Governors

References

1958 births
Chairmen of the Bank of Estonia
20th-century Estonian economists
Harvard University alumni
Living people
People from Chicago
Recipients of the Order of the White Star, 3rd Class
University of British Columbia alumni
American people of Estonian descent
21st-century Estonian economists